Stefano Dall'Acqua (born July 13, 1981) is a retired Italian former footballer.

Career
Dall'Acqua made his debut for Derthona in Serie D. He was then transferred to Reggina, and was loaned to Lecco and Gela in January. In summer 2001, he was loaned to Pro Patria, also in Serie C2. In summer 2002, he moved to Cittadella in Serie C1.

He made his Serie A debut on August 30, 2003, Reggina 2–2 draw with Sampdoria.

He then signed for Treviso of Serie B. But after the club was promoted to Serie A, he never had a chance to play and was loaned to Calcio Catania, where he won promotion to Serie A again.

In the 2006–07 season, he was loaned to Foggia and Novara of Serie C1.

In the 2007–08 season, he played for Serie B newcomer Grosseto.

In July 2008, he played for Reggiana on loan.

In the 2009–10 season, he joined Serie C2 team Juve Stabia. On February 1, 2010 he left for Valle del Giovenco, who also signed forward Giuseppe Caccavallo and Maikol Negro a few weeks earlier. He started in the 2 relegation playoffs, partnered with Negro.

From 2010 to 2014, he played for Opitergina, Sacilese, Lentigione and Formigine.

In summer 2014, he moved to Atletico San Paolo Padova in Serie D. In September 2014, he transferred to Portomansuè in Promozione.

References

External links
 La Gazzetta dello Sport Profile (2007–08 season) 
 
 
 Stefano Dall'Acqua at TuttoCampo (1/2)
 Stefano Dall'Acqua at TuttoCampo (2/2)

Italian footballers
Italy under-21 international footballers
A.S.D. HSL Derthona players
Reggina 1914 players
Calcio Lecco 1912 players
Aurora Pro Patria 1919 players
A.S. Cittadella players
Treviso F.B.C. 1993 players
Catania S.S.D. players
Calcio Foggia 1920 players
Novara F.C. players
F.C. Grosseto S.S.D. players
A.C. Reggiana 1919 players
S.S. Juve Stabia players
A.S.D. Sacilese Calcio players
A.S. Pescina Valle del Giovenco players
F.C.D. Conegliano Calcio 1907 players
Serie A players
Serie B players
Association football forwards
People from Oderzo
1981 births
Living people
Sportspeople from the Province of Treviso
Footballers from Veneto